Uzbekistan competed at the 2006 Winter Olympics in Turin, Italy.

Alpine skiing

Kayrat Ermetov finished second-to-last in the men's slalom, seventeen seconds behind the event's winner, Benjamin Raich.

Figure skating 

The 16th-place finish from the pairs team of Marina Aganina and Artem Knyazev was the highest for Uzbekistan in Turin.

Key: CD = Compulsory Dance, FD = Free Dance, FS = Free Skate, OD = Original Dance, SP = Short Program

References

Nations at the 2006 Winter Olympics
2006
Winter Olympics